Hesperocharis nera, the Nera white, is a butterfly of the family Pieridae. It is found in Trinidad, Ecuador, Peru, Colombia, Suriname, the Guianas, Brazil and Bolivia.

Subspecies
H. n. nera (Ecuador)
H. n. aida Fruhstorfer, 1908 (Peru, Bolivia)
H. n. amazonica Fruhstorfer, 1907 (Peru, Ecuador)
H. n. lamonti Kaye, 1920 (Trinidad)
H. n. nereis C. & R. Felder, 1865 (Colombia)
H. n. nerida Zikán, 1940 (Brazil: Amazonas)
H. n. nymphaea Möschler, 1876 (Surinam, Guyana, Brazil: Amazonas)

References

Butterflies described in 1852
Anthocharini
Fauna of Brazil
Pieridae of South America
Taxa named by William Chapman Hewitson